Hortense Richard (1860–1939 or 1940) was a French painter.

Biography
Richard was born on 24 June 1860 in Paris. She studied with Delphine Arnould de Cool-Fortin, Jules Joseph Lefebvre and William-Adolphe Bouguereau. She married fellow painter  in 1879.

She exhibited at the Paris Salon from 1875 to 1935. Richard exhibited  her work at the Palace of Fine Arts and The Woman's Building at the 1893 World's Columbian Exposition in Chicago, Illinois.

She died in 1939 or 1940.

Gallery

References

External links
 

1860 births
1940 deaths
19th-century French women artists
20th-century French women artists
19th-century French painters
20th-century French painters